Howard Middle School may refer to:

Howard Middle School (Ocala, Florida)
Howard Middle School (Orlando, Florida)
Howard Middle School (Macon, Georgia)